The University of Tirana (abbreviated UT) is a public university located at the central borough of Tirana 10 in Tirana, Albania. It was established as the State University of Tirana in 1957 through merging of five existing institutes of higher education.

The main building was planned by Italian architect, Gherardo Bosio at the beginning of 1940. It is situated at the Mother Teresa Square, south of the city center of Tirana.

The primary language of instruction is Albanian, but there are a number of faculties of foreign languages which are carried out in English, French, Greek, Italian, Spanish, German, Chinese and other languages.

The University of Tirana was founded in 1957 as the State University of Tirana, through the merging of five existing institutes of higher education, the most important of which was the Institute of Sciences, founded in 1947. Immediately after the death of Enver Hoxha in 1985, the university was renamed the Enver Hoxha University of Tirana until 1992.

Academics and size
The university is the largest and highest ranking university in Albania. It includes eight colleges, 50 academic departments, and 41 study programs or majors. Most programs are offered in Tirana; a few smaller affiliated campuses are located in other Albanian cities, including Saranda in the southern part of the country and Kukës in the north. It offers three-year Bachelor, one- or two-year Master, and three- to five-year doctorate degree programs, in accordance with the Bologna system.

The current campus is urban and decentralised. A new large and centralised campus has been planned in the southeast periphery of Tirana. Students dorms are grouped in a separate location called Student City (Qyteti Studenti) in southeast Tirana.

UT is the biggest university in Albania, and among the biggest in Europe with 35 000 students. In 2013 the college accepted 95 new Ph.D. students. These are students in possession of bachelor's degrees.

Faculties and departments

 Faculty of Social Sciences
 Faculty of Natural Sciences
 Faculty of History and Philology
 Faculty of Law
 Faculty of Economic Sciences
 Faculty of Foreign Languages
 Department of Physical Education

Notable people 
 

 Sali Berisha (born 1944), cardiologist, President of Albania and Prime Minister
 Shpresa Gjongecaj (born 1952), Professor of Numismatics
 Odhise Grillo, writer of children's books
 Nexhmije Hoxha (1921–2020), politician
 Shefki Hysa, writer and journalist
 Helena Kadare (born 1943), author 
 Ismail Kadare (born 1936), novelist and poet, winner of the 2005 Man Booker International Prize, the 2009 Prince of Asturias Award, and the 2015 Jerusalem Prize.
 Harilla Papajorgji (1933–2019), politician and professor
 Ardian Klosi (1957–2012), publicist and activist
 Dhori Kule (born 1957), Rector of the University of Tirana
 Pandeli Majko (born 1967), politician
 Jakup Mato (1934–2005), publicist and educational administrator
 Laura Mersini-Houghton, cosmologist, theoretical physicist, and professor 
 Ilir Meta (born 1969), Albanian President
 Fatos Nano (born 1952), Prime Minister of Albania, member of the Albanian Parliament
 Anila Paparisto, entomologist and 2002 L'Oréal-UNESCO For Women in Science Awards recipient.

See also 
 Education in Albania
 List of universities in Albania

References

External links 

 unitir.edu.al – Official Website 

 
Educational institutions established in 1957
Universities and colleges in Tirana
Universities established in the 20th century
1957 establishments in Albania